Tully Cameron Banta-Cain (born August 28, 1980) is a former American football linebacker. He was drafted by the New England Patriots in the seventh round of the 2003 NFL Draft. He played college football at California.

Banta-Cain earned two Super Bowl rings during his first stint with the Patriots. He also played for the San Francisco 49ers.

Early years
Tully Banta-Cain is of African-American and Scottish/Irish descent. He is the cousin of former NBA forward Rodney Rogers and former MLB outfielder Jeffrey Leonard.

While attending Fremont High School in Sunnyvale, California, Banta-Cain won All-League honors playing outside linebacker as a senior, was the League's Defensive Player of the Year as a junior, and gained more than 1,000 yards as a running back.

College career
Banta-Cain played college football at the University of California, Berkeley where he finished his career with 112 tackles and 26.5 sacks. He also holds Cal’s single game sack record (4.5). He redshirted in 1998, and then appeared in five games as a freshman in 1999. As a sophomore, Banta-Cain recorded 35 tackles and 5.5 sacks, and as a junior in 2001, he started every game at defensive end and tallied eight sacks and 33 tackles. As a senior in 2002, Banta-Cain was named to the All-Pac-10 first team and was the team's Defensive Most Valuable Player, finishing with 39 tackles, 13 sacks, and 22 tackles for a loss. His 26.5 career sacks ranked third in the school's record books behind Regan Upshaw and Andre Carter.

While at Berkeley, Banta-Cain was a member of the Sigma Phi Society of the Thorsen House.

Professional career

New England Patriots 2003–2006
Banta-Cain was drafted by the New England Patriots in the seventh round (239th overall) in the 2003 NFL Draft. In his rookie season, he played in nine games recording 11 tackles and one sack against the Buffalo Bills on December 27. In 2004, he played in all 16 games and finished the season with 28 tackles, 1.5 sacks and his first career interception again against the Buffalo Bills on November 14. He also was part of the Super Bowl XXXVIII winning team. The following season, he only managed to record nine tackles and 0.5 sacks but again was part of the team which won Super Bowl XXXIX. In his final year with the Patriots, he played in all 16 games including five starts and finished the season with 43 tackles and a career-high 5.5 sacks.

San Francisco 49ers 2007–2008
Banta-Cain was signed to a 3-year $12 million deal by the San Francisco 49ers as an unrestricted free agent on March 3, 2007. In his debut season, Banta-Cain started in four consecutive games until suffering a high ankle sprain during the 2nd quarter of a close 9–7 loss to the Baltimore Ravens. However, Banta-Cain continued to play due to a timely bye week following the injury, allowing him to not miss a game and still record a career-high 61 tackles and 3.5 sack on the year. He also scored the game-winning touchdown, in a November 25, 2007 game against the Arizona Cardinals, by recovering a fumble in the endzone in overtime. The win snapped an eight-game losing streak. He ended the year with ten starts and the 49ers ended the season with a 5–11 record. In his second season with the 49ers, Banta-Cain was inactive for the first four games of the season under Mike Nolan then activated to start on sub packages and special teams against the New England Patriots recording a half a sack and 5 tackles. Banta-Cain did not play another defensive snap for the season; however, he did manage to lead the team with 20 Special Teams tackles on a 6th ranked Special Teams unit coached by Al Everest (now with the Pittsburgh Steelers). The team finished with a 7–9 record. He was released under Mike Singletary on February 10, 2009.

New England Patriots 2009–2010
Just eight days after his release from the 49ers, Banta-Cain was re-signed by the New England Patriots on February 18, 2009. Banta-Cain was released on October 19 and reportedly re-signed the next day to a new contract through the 2011 season. However, the signing was not official as of the end of the regular season. He started 10 of the 16 games he played in 2009, recording 55 tackles and a career-high 10 sacks.

Banta-Cain was officially re-signed to a three-year contract on March 5, 2010, the first day of free agency. The deal included a $6 million signing bonus, and averages $4.5 million per year. However, that yearly average can be raised to as high as $6 million if all performance incentives are met, raising the maximum value of the 3-year deal to $19 million.

In Week 2 of the 2010 season, Banta-Cain started against the New York Jets, recording eight tackles and one sack in the Patriots loss. In the second quarter, Banta-Cain was penalized 15 yards for unnecessary roughness, and was pulled from the game in favor of rookie Jermaine Cunningham, who replaced Banta-Cain as a starter in the Patriots' base defense for the next game. Banta-Cain went on to make 6 starts in 15 games played, recording 45 tackles and five sacks.

On July 29, 2011, it was announced that Banta-Cain had been released by the New England Patriots.

References

External links
 Cal Bears bio
 New England Patriots bio
 San Francisco 49ers bio

1980 births
African-American players of American football
American football defensive ends
American football outside linebackers
California Golden Bears football players
Living people
New England Patriots players
People from Mountain View, California
Players of American football from California
San Francisco 49ers players
Sportspeople from Sunnyvale, California
21st-century African-American sportspeople
20th-century African-American people